Espira-de-l'Agly is a commune in the Pyrénées-Orientales department in southern France.

Geography

Localisation 
Espira-de-l'Agly is located in the canton of La Vallée de l'Agly and in the arrondissement of Perpignan. Espira-de-l'Agly is situated approximately 12 km outside Perpignan.

Population

See also
Communes of the Pyrénées-Orientales department

References

Communes of Pyrénées-Orientales